The following are the squads for the 2022 AFF Women's Championship, hosted by Philippines, which took place 4 to 17 July 2022.

Group A

Thailand
Head coach:  Miyo Okamoto

Philippines
Head coach:  Alen Stajcic

Indonesia
Head coach: Rudy Eka Priyambada

Singapore
Head coach: Stephen Ng

Australia U23
The final squad was announced on 1 July 2022.

Head coach: Melissa Andreatta

Malaysia
Head coach: Jacob Joseph

Group B

Vietnam
Head coach: Mai Đức Chung

Myanmar
Head coach: Thet Thet Win

|-
! colspan="9"  style="background:yellow; text-align:left;"|
|- style="background:#dfedfd;"

|-
! colspan="9"  style="background:green; text-align:left;"|
|- style="background:#dfedfd;"

|-
! colspan="9"  style="background:red; text-align:left;"|
|- style="background:#dfedfd;"

Timor-Leste
Head coach:  Lee Min-young

Cambodia
Head coach: Prak Vuthy

Laos
Head coach: Vongmisay Soubouakham

References

Women's AFF Championship squads